This is a list of the guests who appeared on the American sketch comedy television program Rowan & Martin's Laugh-In, which ran from January 22, 1968, to May 14, 1973. The program, hosted by Dan Rowan and Dick Martin with a regularly featured cast, made prominent use of celebrity guests during each episode. Some guests had a prominent role in an episode, while others appeared for a single gag. Some guests filmed a number of pieces at a time, which were then used in a number of different episodes.

1968

Herb Alpert & the Tijuana Brass
Don Adams
Nancy Ames
Eve Arden
Pamela Austin
Barbara Bain
Kaye Ballard
Billy Barty
Elgin Baylor
The Bee Gees
Harry Belafonte
Milton Berle
Shelley Berman
Joey Bishop
John Byner
Godfrey Cambridge
Leo G. Carroll
Cher 
Rosemary Clooney
Tim Conway
Joseph Cotten
Robert Culp
Tony Curtis
Arlene Dahl
Bill Dana
Bobby Darin
Jimmy Dean
Phyllis Diller
Hugh Downs
Kirk Douglas
Nanette Fabray
Douglas Fairbanks Jr.
Sally Field
Barbara Feldon
James Garner
Greer Garson
Mitzi Gaynor
George Gobel
Dick Gregory
Lorne Greene
Buddy Hackett
Phil Harris
Hugh Hefner
The Holy Modal Rounders
Bob Hope
Lena Horne
Rock Hudson
George Jessel
Van Johnson
Anissa Jones
George Kirby
Werner Klemperer
Martin Landau
Muriel Landers
Abbe Lane
Jack Lemmon
Sheldon Leonard
Liberace
Jerry Lewis
Rich Little
Guy Lombardo
Marcel Marceau
Ed McMahon
Pat Morita
Greg Morris
Bob Newhart
Leonard Nimoy
The Nitty Gritty Dirt Band
Richard Nixon
France Nuyen
Regis Philbin
Edward Platt
Otto Preminger
Vincent Price
Jack Riley
Cliff Robertson
Kenny Rogers & The First Edition
Jill St. John
Colonel Sanders
Rod Serling
Dinah Shore
Walter Slezak
Kate Smith
Tom Smothers
Sonny & Cher
Connie Stevens
Larry Storch
The Strawberry Alarm Clock
The Temptations
Terry-Thomas
Sonny Tufts
Michael Wayne
Patrick Wayne
Paul Winchell

1969

Mel Brooks
Sid Caesar
Michael Caine
Carol Channing
Perry Como
Tony Curtis
Phyllis Diller
James Drury
Peter Falk
Tennessee Ernie Ford
James Garner
Greer Garson
Mitzi Gaynor
George Gobel
Frank Gorshin
Billy Graham
Lorne Greene
Buddy Hackett
Laurence Harvey
Bob Hope
Lena Horne
Rock Hudson
Engelbert Humperdinck
Anne Jackson
David Janssen
George Jessel
Van Johnson
Davy Jones
Tom Kennedy
Werner Klemperer
Jack E. Leonard
Liberace
Rich Little
Gina Lollobrigida
Guy Lombardo
Marcel Marceau
Doug McClure
Ed McMahon
Ann Miller
The Monkees (Without Peter Tork) 
Garry Moore
Roger Moore
Bob Newhart
Richard Nixon
Pat Nixon
Debbie Reynolds
Don Rickles
Cliff Robertson
Diana Ross
Nipsey Russell
Jill St. John
Romy Schneider
Peter Sellers
Frank Sinatra Jr.
Nancy Sinatra
The Smothers Brothers
Sonny & Cher
Connie Stevens
Jacqueline Susann
Forrest Tucker
Robert Wagner
Wiere Brothers
Eli Wallach
Paul Winchell
Shelley Winters
Lana Wood

1970

Desi Arnaz
Jim Backus
Edgar Bergen
Milton Berle
Ken Berry
William F. Buckley Jr.
Michael Caine
Art Carney
Carol Channing
Perry Como
Tim Conway
Wally Cox
Bing Crosby
Tony Curtis
Tennessee Ernie Ford
David Frost
James Garner
Greer Garson
Andy Griffith
Buddy Hackett
Don Ho
Engelbert Humperdinck
Danny Kaye
Sheldon Leonard
George Lindsey
Rich Little
Ed McMahon
Ricardo Montalban
Roger Moore
Zero Mostel
Vincent Price
Carl Reiner
Debbie Reynolds
Don Rickles
Jilly Rizzo
Mickey Rooney
Jill St. John
Peter Sellers
Rod Serling
Dinah Shore
Phil Silvers
Nancy Sinatra
Tom Smothers
Ringo Starr
Orson Welles
Andy Williams
Jonathan Winters

1971

Herschel Bernardi
Joey Bishop
Vida Blue
James Brolin
Truman Capote
Jack Cassidy
Wilt Chamberlain
Chuck Connors
Richard Crenna
Bing Crosby
Tony Curtis
Roman Gabriel
Frank Gorshin
Andy Granatelli
Lee Grant
Andy Griffith
Rita Hayworth
Bob Hope
Fernando Lamas
Janet Leigh
Marcello Mastroianni
Liza Minnelli
Martha Beall Mitchell
Ricardo Montalban
Joe Namath
Jilly Rizzo
Edward G. Robinson
Sugar Ray Robinson
Bill Russell
Jill St. John
Doug Sanders
Doc Severinsen
Willie Shoemaker
Dinah Shore
Buffalo Bob Smith
Vin Scully
David Steinberg
Karen Valentine
Gore Vidal
Raquel Welch
Sam Yorty

See also
 List of Rowan & Martin's Laugh-In episodes

Sources
 

Rowan & Martin